The Cary Building at 105-107 Chambers Street, extending along Church Street to Reade Street, in the Tribeca neighborhood of Manhattan, New York City, was built in 1856-1857 and was designed by Gamaliel King and John Kellum ("King & Kellum") in the Italian Renaissance revival style, with the cast-iron facade provided by Daniel D. Badger's Architectural Iron Work. The five-story twin-facaded building was constructed for William H. Cary's Cary, Howard & Sanger, a dry goods firm.

Although built as a commercial structure, the Cary Building is now residential. As a result of the widening of Church Street in the 1920s, a 200-foot-long wall of unadorned brick is now exposed on the east side of the building; as Christopher Gray observed in The New York Times, comparing the structure to cast-iron buildings with facades obscured by modern signage, "There is not too little of the Cary Building but too much."

In 1973, the artist Knox Martin was commissioned to create a 280-foot canopy that wrapped around the building. Ada Louise Huxtable wrote in The New York Times: "...credited Knox Martin with the graphics, including the supersign on the building's side and the continuous, brightly patterned abstract awning sheltering the shops. It is a fine example of combining new with old for practicality, continuity and art."

The building was designated a New York City landmark in 1982, and was listed on the U.S. National Register of Historic Places in 1983. The building was once home to The New York Sun.

See also 
 List of New York City Landmarks
 National Register of Historic Places listings in New York County, New York

References 
Notes

External links 

1857 establishments in New York (state)
Buildings and structures on the National Register of Historic Places in Manhattan
Cast-iron architecture in New York City
New York City Designated Landmarks in Manhattan
Tribeca